The MTV Video Music Awards Japan 2005 were hosted by Takashi Fujii and Megumi at Tokyo Bay NK Hall, the awards included performances by Namie Amuro, Rain, Mariah Carey, Hoobastank, Jamiroquai and Ashanti.

Awards
Winners are in bold text.

Video of the Year
Orange Range — "Hana"
 Namie Amuro — "Girl Talk"
 Destiny's Child — "Lose My Breath"
 Eminem — "Just Lose It"
 Usher featuring Lil' Jon and Ludacris — "Yeah!"

Album of the Year
Orange Range — MusiQ
 Eminem — Encore
 Green Day — American Idiot
 Ken Hirai — Sentimentalovers
 Usher — Confessions

Best Male Video
Ken Hirai — "Hitomi o Tojite"
 Kreva — "Hitori Janai No Yo"
 Tamio Okuda — "Nanto Iu"
 Usher featuring Lil' Jon and Ludacris — "Yeah!"
 Kanye West — "Jesus Walks"

Best Female Video
Mika Nakashima — "Sakurairo Mau Koro"
 Ayumi Hamasaki — "Inspire"
 Avril Lavigne — "My Happy Ending"
 Jennifer Lopez — "Get Right"
 Hikaru Utada — "Easy Breezy"

Best Group Video
Linkin Park — "Breaking The Habit"
 Asian Kung-Fu Generation — "Kimi no Machi Made"
 Destiny's Child — "Lose My Breath"
 Exile — "Carry On"
 Orange Range — "Locolotion"

Best New Artist
Sambomaster — "Utsukushiki Ningen no Hibi"
 Ciara featuring Petey Pablo — "Goodies"
 Franz Ferdinand — "Take Me Out"
 Nobodyknows — "Kokoro Odoru"
 Ashlee Simpson — "Pieces of Me"

Best Rock Video
Hoobastank — "The Reason"
 Asian Kung-Fu Generation — "Kimi no Machi Made"
 Good Charlotte — "Predictable"
 Linkin Park — "Breaking The Habit"
 Sambomaster — "Utsukushiki Ningen no Hibi"

Best Pop Video
Ketsumeishi — "Kimi ni Bump"
 Blue — "Curtain Falls"
 Exile — "Carry On"
 Gwen Stefani — "What You Waiting For?"
 Yuki — "Joy"

Best R&B Video
Namie Amuro — "Girl Talk"
 AI — "E.O."
 Crystal Kay — "Kiss"
 Alicia Keys — "If I Ain't Got You"
 Usher — "Burn"

Best Hip Hop Video
Beastie Boys — "Ch-Check It Out"
 The Black Eyed Peas — "Let's Get It Started"
 Kreva featuring Mummy-D — "Funky Glamorous"
 Nitro Microphone Underground — "Still Shinin"
 Kanye West — "Jesus Walks"

Best Video from a Film
Ken Hirai — "Hitomi o Tojite" (from Crying Out Love in the Center of the World)
 Christina Aguilera featuring Missy Elliott — "Car Wash" (from Shark Tale)
 Ray Charles — "What'd I Say" (from Ray)
 Ana Johnsson — "We Are" (from Spider-Man 2)
 Orange Range — "Hana" (from Be with You)

Best Collaboration
Jay-Z/Linkin Park — "Numb/Encore"
 AI featuring Afra + Tucker — "Watch Out!"
 Kiyoshiro Imawano featuring Rhymester — "Ame Agarino Yozora Ni 35"
 Snoop Dogg featuring Pharrell — "Drop It Like It's Hot"
 Usher and Alicia Keys — "My Boo"

Best Buzz Asia

Japan
Orange Range — "Locolotion"
 Exile — "Real World"
 Gospellers — "Mimoza"
 Tokyo Jihen — "Gunjō Biyori"
 Yuki — "Joy"

South Korea
Rain — "It's Raining"
 Tony An — "Love Is More Beautiful When You Can't Have IT"
 g.o.d — "An Ordinary Day"
 Jang Nara — "Winter Diary"
 Tim — "Thank You"

Taiwan
Stefanie Sun — "Running"
 Stanley Huang — "Who am I to You"
 Fish Liang — "Can't Hear It"
 S.H.E — "Persian Cat"
 Jolin Tsai — "Pirates"

Special awards

Best Director
Yasuo Inoue

Best Special Effects
Gagle — "Rap Wonder DX"

Best Style
Ashanti

Most Entertaining Video
Gorie with Jasmine Ann Allen and Yamasaki Joann Shikou — "Micky"

International Video Icon Award
Mariah Carey

Most Impressive Performing Asian Artist
Namie Amuro

Live performances
Ashanti
Crystal Kay
Gorie
Hoobastank
Jamiroquai
Ken Hirai
Mariah Carey
Namie Amuro
Orange Range
Rain

References

2005 in Japanese music